Radio Miljacka is a Bosnian commercial radio station, broadcasting from Sarajevo, Bosnia and Herzegovina.

Radio Miljacka began broadcasting on 1 August 2018. and it was formatted as Variety radio station with Bosnian music and Balkan music, talk shows and short news. The radio station is owned by the company Radio televizija 8 d.o.o. Sarajevo, which is also the owner of sister station Radio 8.

The program is currently broadcast at one frequency for Sarajevo area  and the headquarters is located in Stari Grad Sarajevo, Vratnik neighborhood.

Frequencies

 Sarajevo

References

External links 
 www.radiomiljacka.ba
 Communications Regulatory Agency of Bosnia and Herzegovina

See also 
List of radio stations in Bosnia and Herzegovina

Sarajevo
Radio stations established in 2018
Mass media in Sarajevo